Alexander Michel Odeh ( اسكندر ميكل عودة; April 4, 1944 – October 11, 1985) was a Palestinian activist who was assassinated in a bombing as he opened the door of his office at 1905 East 17th Street, Santa Ana, California. Odeh was west-coast regional director of the American-Arab Anti-Discrimination Committee (ADC).

Life and murder
Born into a Palestinian Christian (Latin rite Catholic) family in Jifna, Mandatory Palestine, Odeh immigrated to the United States in 1972 at the age of 28. He was a lecturer and poet who had published a volume of his poetry, Whispers in Exile.

The Boston office of the American-Arab Anti-Discrimination Committee suffered a bombing on August 16, 1985, injuring two officers. The Santa Ana bombing came the day after the ending of the Palestine Liberation Front–sponsored Achille Lauro hijacking in which Jewish American Leon Klinghoffer was killed. The night before his death Odeh denied to the media that the PLO was involved in the hijacking and portrayed Palestinian leader Yassir Arafat as being ready to make peace. The day of his murder he had been scheduled to speak at Friday prayer services at a synagogue in Fountain Valley, California.

Shortly before his killing, Odeh appeared on the television show Nightline. The program featured a back-and-forth between Odeh and a representative from the Jewish Defense League.

Reaction to murder
The Anti-Defamation League and the American Jewish Committee both condemned the murder. United States President Ronald Reagan sent a message of condolence.

Irv Rubin, who had become chairman of the Jewish Defense League (JDL) the same year, immediately made several public statements in reaction to the incident. "I have no tears for Mr. Odeh", Rubin said. "He got exactly what he deserved." He also said: "My tears were used up crying for Leon Klinghoffer."

Criminal investigation
Four weeks after Odeh's death, FBI spokesperson Lane Bonner stated the FBI attributed the bombing and two others to the JDL. Rubin criticized the FBI for implying his organization's guilt without evidence, saying the FBI "could take their possible link and shove it." In February 1986, the FBI classified the bombing that killed Alex Odeh as a terrorist act. In July, they eased away from their original position, saying the JDL was "probably" responsible for this attack and four others, but that final attribution to the JDL or any other group "must await further investigation." Rubin again denied the JDL's involvement. "What the FBI is doing is simple", he stated, "Some character calls up a news agency or whatever and uses the phrase Never Again, ... and on that assumption they can go and slander a whole group. That's tragic." The JDL denied any involvement in Odeh's killing.

Immediately after the 1985 assassination the FBI identified three suspects, Robert Manning, Keith Fuchs and Andy Green, all of them believed to be affiliated with the JDL, who fled to Israel soon after the incident. Floyd Clarke, then assistant director of the FBI, claimed in an internal memo that key suspects had fled to Israel and were living in Kiryat Arba, an Israeli settlement in the West Bank.

Arrest and trial of Robert Manning 
In 1988, the FBI arrested Rochelle Manning, Robert Manning's wife, as a suspect in a mail bombing which killed a computer company secretary, Patricia Wilkerson, in Manhattan Beach, California, in July 1980. Rochelle Manning was also considered a possible suspect in Odeh's murder. It also charged her husband, Robert Manning, who was considered a prime suspect in the Odeh bombing. Manning had previously been convicted of a 1972 bombing of the home of an Arab activist in Hollywood, and was a suspect in three other bombings in 1985, one of which killed a Neo-Nazi. Both Rochelle and Robert Manning were members of the JDL. Rochelle's jury deadlocked, and after the mistrial she left for Israel to join her husband.

In 1989, American journalist Chris Hedges discovered Robert Manning's residency in Kiryat Arba due to his use of a compromised alias. The US government requested Robert Manning's extradition in 1991. It also requested Rochelle Manning be extradited for a retrial. After an unsuccessful two-year legal battle in the Israeli courts to prevent his extradition, Robert Manning was extradited in 1993. Robert Manning was charged with the bombing attack that killed Wilkerson and convicted; in February 1994, Judge Dickran Tevrizian sentenced him to life imprisonment with a minimum of 30 years before parole. This was subsequently reduced to a minimum of 10 years before parole. After some years imprisoned at USP Lompoc, Manning was transferred to the medium security federal prison in Phoenix, Arizona. He has so far not been granted parole. Rochelle Manning died in an Israeli prison in 1994 while awaiting extradition to the United States after the Israeli Supreme Court rejected her final appeal against extradition.

Later developments 
In April 1994, the Alex Odeh Memorial Statue, created by Algerian-American sculptor Khalil Bendib, was erected in front of the Santa Ana Central Library over protests by the Jewish Defense League. On October 11, 1996, the eleventh anniversary of his murder, vandals defaced the statue. On February 6, 1997, vandals poured two gallons of red paint on the statue. JDL chairman Irv Rubin commented: "I think the guy [Odeh] is a war criminal." The American-Arab Anti-Discrimination Committee called for greater government efforts to catch Odeh's killers.

On August 27, 1996, the FBI announced a $1 million reward for information leading to the arrest of Odeh's killers. JDL members heckled the FBI spokespersons announcing the reward. The reward is still in force.

In 2007, the FBI revealed they had received information from a deceased informant, believed to be former Jewish Defense League member Earl Krugel, who had been sentenced to 20 years in federal prison for 2001 plots to bomb a Southern California mosque and office of an Arab American congressman. It is believed that Irv Rubin, who died in prison while awaiting trial on the same charges, revealed to Krugel the names of those responsible for Odeh's death and Krugel shared those with the FBI before he, too, died in prison. The bombers are believed to be Manning and two other JDL activists, Keith Fuchs and Andy Green, all of whom fled to Israel where they have avoided prosecution and extradition.. Manning is believed to have settled in West Bank Israeli settlement of Kiryat Arba.

The American-Arab Anti-Discrimination Committee continues to honor Odeh's memory and call for prosecution of his killers.

As of 2020, Andy Green (1960–), now known as Baruch Ben-Yosef, and Keith Fuchs, now known as Israel Fuchs are living freely in Israel.

See also
History of Palestinians in Los Angeles
List of unsolved murders
Palestinian Christians

References

Books

External links
Erik Skindrud, Twenty years later, still no charges in Alex Odeh assassination, The Electronic Intifada, December 6, 2006.
Santa Ana Library photograph of Alex Odeh statue
Democracy Now!, FBI Urged to Reopen Probe Into 1985 Assassination of Arab-American Leader Alex Odeh in California, broadcast October 17, 2013 (video, audio, and transcript available)
FBI: Seeking Information Page on Alex Odeh's Murder

1944 births
1985 deaths
1985 murders in the United States
Activists from California
American terrorism victims
Assassinated American activists
Deaths by improvised explosive device in the United States
Male murder victims
Palestinian emigrants to the United States
Palestinian Roman Catholics
People from Ramallah and al-Bireh Governorate
People murdered in California
Terrorism deaths in California
Unsolved murders in the United States
Victims of religiously motivated violence in the United States